Trams in Dalian have been operating continuously since 1909 making them one of the oldest tram systems still in use in Mainland China. There were once eleven routes in operation in Dalian in the Northeast China. Only two routes remain in use today (Route 201 and 202). There was a route 203 which currently merged into route 201. Notably, most of the staff on Dalian's tram system are female, i.e. – driver, conductor, points man — even the depot manager. The tram system was the only rail network in the city, until Dalian Metro opened in 2003.

History
Trams in Dalian have a long history, stretching as far back as the late Qing dynasty. On September 25, 1909, the South Manchuria Railway opened the first tram line for testing in Dalian. The city at that time was under Japanese occupation. This was the first example of public transportation in the city, making Dalian one of the earliest Mainland Chinese cities to have a public transport service. The original tram line ran from the Electrical Recreation Grounds (present-day Eton Place) to Tai Pier (now known as Harbour Bridge) via Taisho Road (present-day Zhongshan and Renmin Roads) spanning 2.45 kilometers. There were thirty Type-11 tram cars in service at that time. The body of the Type-11 tram car was manufactured by Preston works in the United States whereas its chassis was manufactured by Montien Gibson Manufacturing in the United Kingdom. Its electrical components were manufactured in Germany. This type of tram car was built with a wooden body and two motorman's seats. It could carry 72 passengers per car in normal use and up to 145 at maximum capacity. At that time the Type-11 tram car was commonly known as the, "American large wooden cages."  Later, new tram lines were added and two tram yards were built next to Minzhu Square and Jiefang Square. By 1945, a total of 11 tram routes, three premises, and two repair workshops were in operation.

In 1945, the Soviet Union Red Army defeated Japanese forces located in Manchuria and occupied Dalian near the end of World War II. On 1 April 1946, the Soviet Union Red Army requisitioned the Dalian Trams from the Dalian Urban Transport Co., Ltd., which was a subsidiary of the South Manchuria Railway, taking the responsibility of transport business in the Dalian area, and transformed the Dalian transport service into the Dalian City transportation company.

In the 1970s, due to urban development most of the tram lines were removed. At that time the No. 1 Tram line was abandoned and now the No. 15 bus line serves the route instead. At the end of the 20th century, Dalian city had only three tram routes: route No. 201, 202 and 203.

Between 15 October 1999 and 1 December 2002, route No. 202  was reformed. Some of the vehicles of type DL8000 retired and others were sold to Changchun city (now in operation as route No.54 of the Changchun Tram system). For the replacement of the DL8000 cars, the Tram Factory of Dalian Public Transport Group built type DL6W tram cars. From 10 June 2006 to 30 December 2007, route No. 201 and 203 were reformed and merged as the new route 201. Consequently, many tram cars were replaced with type DL6WA cars. Today 27 cars of type DL3000 built by the Japanese in the 1930s still remain and serve on the merged route 201 after retrofitting.

Historic Overview
 1909: electric trams started operating.
 1945: the tramway network reached its maximum length, up to 11 routes.
 1946: eight routes were closed step by step until 1979.
 2002: some rolling stock was replaced by low floor trams.
 30 December 2007: routes No. 201 and 203 were merged to form new route No. 201, with the rolling stock partly replaced by low floored trams.

Tram routes
There are two tram routes operating as of 2018. Tram routes of Dalian are prefixed by 20. The tram network serves the down-town and south-western areas in the city. There used to exist a Line 203 which ran the eastern half of what is today Line 201 from Dalian Railway Station. Lines 201 and 203 was merged to create a larger Line 201, and now the modern 201 trams stop service at Huale Square (marked as 区间, which means services on only part of the route) and a free shuttle tram service will be running the rest part

 201 – Haizhiyun Park – Xinggong Street (via Dalian Railway Station)
This route passes through busy residential areas.

Route – Haizhiyun Park --> Jinguang East Coast --> Haichangxincheng --> Huale Square --> Chunhai Street --> Siergou --> Erqi Square --> Sanba Square --> Shiji Street --> Minzhu Square --> Minsheng Street --> Shengli Bridge --> Dalian Railway Station --> Dongguan Street --> Shichang Street --> Beijing Street --> Datong Street --> Wuyi Square --> Zhengong Street --> Xinggong Street

 202 – Xinggong Street – Xiaopingdao Qian
This route links the downtown area to the tourist spot of Xinghai Scenic Area, passing through Exhibition Center, Xinghai Square and Xinghai Park.

Route – Xinggong Street --> Sunrise Shopping Center --> Jiefang Square --> Gongcheng Street --> Peace Plaza --> Exhibition Center --> Xinghai Square --> Institute of Chemical Physics --> The Second Affiliated Hospital of Dalian Medical University --> Xinghai Park --> Heishijiao --> Xueyuan Square Metro Station --> Dalian Maritime University --> Wanda Plaza --> High-Tech Industrial Zone --> China Hualu --> Qixianling --> Hekou --> Xiaopingdao Qian

Practical Info
Total length – 23.4 km (10.8 km on route 201, 12.6 km on route 202).
Opened — September 1909.
Fare – RMB 1 or 2 in cash, 0.9 or 1.7 if paid with Mingzhu Card or China T-union cards.

Tickets
The Route 201 is divided into two zones delineated by the Dalian Railway Station: the western section is between Haizhiyun Park and Dalian Railway Station, and the eastern section is from Dalian Railway Station to Xinggong Street. The fare is 1 RMB if only one section (including riding on/off at Dalian Railway Station) is used. When riding both sections consecutively, the passenger needs to pay 1 RMB into the fare box in the car when embarking and a crew member collects another 1 RMB when at the Dalian Railway Station stop. If you use Dalian's contactless transit smart card, Mingzhu IC card, the fare is discounted to 0.9 RMB for one section and 1.7 RMB for riding both.

Route 202, after the initial full-line transformation of that route was complete in 2002, a single flat fare was applied for the whole line. The fare was 2 RMB, however the system had been changed and now the fare is 1 RMB. There are no ticket sales within the tram cars. It is necessary to pay the fare in cash or with a Mingzhu IC card when boarding.

Fleet
The trams used a mixture of bow collectors and pantographs. The tram system in Dalian has used a variety of rolling stock though only two types remain in passenger operation:

Depots & termini
There are two depots: Beihekou depot and Mingzhu Square depot.

The termini are – Haizhiyun Park, Xinggong Jie, Xiaopingdao Qian, & the Dalian Railway Station.

Alignment & Interchanges
Most tram routes are on unreserved tracks in the middle of the roads. Track beds on unreserved portions are laid on concrete. At some crossings, trolleybus lines cross tram lines. Recently, route 202 has been re-laid partly on reserved track, and at the side of the road. That route started running low floor trams, which also runs in unreserved portions & route 201.

Interchange with Dalian's light railway is possible at Dalian Railway Station.

Route No. 201 begins at Sea Rhythm Park (however due to construction work at this site the line currently begins at Huale Square). The line runs along Lu Xun Road, Century Street, Changjiang Road to end at Xinggong Street and Xian Road, traveling through 27 Square, 38 Square, Democracy Square, Dalian Railway Station, the North Post Bridge (Dalian Bus Terminal) and Wuyi Square.  DL3000-type vehicles, the tram for 27 Taiwan, in the 20th century, after 30 years of Japanese occupation during the production, were modified in 2007 (and thus some people model themselves after the word "reform" of the alphabet the first letter of the word "G", but actually this letter does not exist in models), and 15 sets of Dalian Tram Bus Group plant in 2007 – 2008 production of "Dalian" and brand DL6WA mixed-type articulated tram.

Route No. 202 begins at Xiaoping Island (Service starts at Qixianling) and runs along Huangpu, Zhongshan Road and Xi'an Roads to end at Xinggong Street, traveling through Qixianling, High-tech Park, Heishijiao, 2nd Hospital of Dalian Medical University, Xinghai Square, Peace Square, and Liberation Square, to the Xi'an Road commercial area. The line operates 40 trams of DL6WA type.

202 Road extension point in the estuary, along the Port Arthur South, Guo waterways, MA North line, end zone at Port Arthur. Elevated across the board, using two dynamic two drag rail transportation vehicles, is actually completely unrelated with the 202 tram independent light rail line, due to rail traffic engineering to avoid the cumbersome approval process and to the existing tram relatively simple procedure Line extension project in the name, it had this name.

See also

Dalian Metro

References

External links

Some good photos of Dalian's various trams (and trolleybuses)

Dalian
Rail transport in Dalian
Dalian